Jonas Mols is a Belgian professional poker player who specializes in online no-limit Texas hold 'em (NLHE). Mols plays on PokerStars under the alias OtB_RedBaron.

Poker career
Mols worked on his game by "reading and analyzing his game" until he improved. He reportedly earned between $4 and $5 million playing online tournaments and cash games at stakes below $25/$50. In 2012 on a thread at Two Plus Two Publishing, Mols documented his goal to play 100,000 hands on PokerStars' Zoom format at the highest stakes and achieve at least a 6 EV bb/100 win rate. He achieved a 3.9 EV bb/100 win rate on his first marathon and a 7 EV bb/100 win rate on his second attempt. Mols has been referred to as an online poker "boss". Professional poker player Andres "Educa-p0ker" Artinano, claimed observing Mols improved his own game play and ranked Mols along with Linus Loeliger and Timofey Kuznetsov as one of the top three 6-max no-limit hold 'em players in the world.

Mols played in the 2016 World Championship of Online Poker $102,000 Super High Roller where he was eliminated by eventual champion "bencb789".

In March 2018, Mols won a $157,425.70 pot online after getting all the money in preflop holding  against Timofey Kuznetsov's . They agreed to run the board twice. The first board ran out  and the second board came  giving the entire pot to Mols.

As of 2020, The online high stakes cash game database has 255,857 hands tracked on his PokerStars account. In that sample, Mols is up $2.093 million, which puts him in the top 30 biggest online cash winners in the site’s database. His winnings come almost entirely from no-limit Texas hold 'em. In 2021, his total live tournament winnings exceeded $57,000.

References

External links
Jonas Mols on Global Poker Index

Belgian poker players
Living people
Year of birth missing (living people)